What Love Songs Didn't Tell You is the 11th studio album by Fish Leong.  It was released on 24 December 2010 by Universal Music Taiwan.

Track listing

External links
 Single "What Love Songs Didn't Tell You" official lyrics
 Single "What Love Songs Didn't Tell You" official MV

Fish Leong albums
2010 albums
Universal Music Taiwan albums
Mandopop albums